Sean B. Williams (born January 28, 1968) is a Canadian retired professional ice hockey centre.

Williams was born in Oshawa, Ontario. As a youth, he played in the 1981 Quebec International Pee-Wee Hockey Tournament with a minor ice hockey team from Oshawa. He played two games in the National Hockey League with the Chicago Blackhawks. Williams was a twelfth round draft pick of the Hawks in 1986. He spent the majority of his career with the Indianapolis Ice of the International Hockey League.

References

External links

1968 births
Canadian ice hockey centres
Chicago Blackhawks draft picks
Chicago Blackhawks players
Ice hockey people from Ontario
Indianapolis Ice players
Living people
Minnesota Moose players
Oshawa Generals players
Saginaw Hawks players
Sportspeople from Oshawa
HC Gardena players
Canadian expatriate ice hockey players in Italy